Marovato is a municipality in Madagascar. It belongs to the district of Ambanja, which is a part of Diana Region. According to 2001 census the population of Marovato was 16,130.

Primary and junior level secondary education are available in town. The majority 99% of the population are farmers.  The most important crop is coffee, while other important products are cocoa and rice.  Services provide employment for 1% of the population.

References and notes 

Populated places in Diana Region